Sweyn Haakonsson (Old Norse: Sveinn Hákonarson) (died c. 1016) was an earl of the house of Hlaðir and co-ruler of Norway from 1000 to c. 1015. He was the son of earl Hákon Sigurðarson. He is first mentioned in connection with the battle of Hjörungavágr, where the Heimskringla says he commanded 60 ships. After the battle of Svolder in the year 1000, Sveinn became co-ruler of Norway with his half-brother, Eiríkr Hákonarson. After Eiríkr went to England in 1014, Sveinn was co-ruler with Hákon Eiríksson. In 1015, Óláfr Haraldsson arrived in Norway and claimed the throne. He defeated Sveinn and his allies in the battle of Nesjar. Sveinn retreated to Sweden, intending to muster a force to retake Norway but he died of an illness before he could return.

Sveinn married Hólmfríðr, who was either the daughter or sister of king Óláfr of Sweden. They had the daughter Sigríðr, who was married to Áslákr, son of Erlingr Skjálgsson. Another daughter, Gunnhildr, was married to Sveinn Úlfsson.

Only one court-poet, Bersi Skáldtorfuson, is recorded as being in Sveinn's service and very little of his poetry has come down to us.

The written sources mentioning Sveinn were all written over 150 years after his death. The Swedish historian Staffan Hellberg in 1972 claimed to be able to show that Sveinn was a fictitious person, and that he had never lived. The debate about this formed part of the wider debate about the value of the 12th and 13th century sagas for 11th century history and earlier, and is an example of the saga skepticism, particularly widespread in Swedish academia. Hellberg's conclusions remain speculative.

Notes

References
Finlay, Alison (editor and translator) (2004). Fagrskinna, a Catalogue of the Kings of Norway. Brill Academic Publishers.  
Hollander, Lee M. (editor and translator). (1991). Heimskringla : History of the Kings of Norway. University of Texas Press. 

1010s deaths
10th-century Norwegian monarchs
11th-century Norwegian monarchs
Regents of Norway
Norwegian earls
Norwegian military leaders
Ladejarl dynasty
11th-century rulers in Europe
Norwegian exiles
Year of birth unknown